Shadow Singmawynn, is a Thai Muay Thai fighter. He is the current Rajadamnern Stadium Welterweight champion.

Background and career
Shadow was born in the Tak province where was raised by a single mother. He started training in Muay Thai at the age of 12, he quickly started to compete as a way to help his family financially. Her was brought to Bangkok to compete for the first time by the owner of the Wan Cherd camp. Shadow later joined the Suan Paeng Mai camp.

On November 24, 2019, Shadow defeated Darky Sawansangmanja by TKO with low kicks at the Channel 7 Stadium for the Kiatpetch promotion.

On September 20, 2020, Shadow defeated Inseethong Por.Pinnapat by doctor stoppage in the fourth round.

On December 8, 2020, Shadow faced Kulabdam Sor.Jor.Piek-U-Thai at the Lumpinee Stadium Brithday show. He lost the fight by knockout in the second round.

During the covid crisis Shadow went away from the rings for year and considered retirement but made the choice to go back to competition this time fighting out of a different gym called Singmawynn.

On February 21, 2022, Shadow faced Julio Lobo for the vacant Rajadamnern Stadium Welterweight title. He won the fight by decision.

On July 22, 2022, Shadow engaged in the Rajadamnern World Series, facing Jonathan Betts in the first round of the group stage. On December 16, Shadow reached the final where competed for the title and the one million baht cash prize against Sibmuen Sitchefboontham. Shadow won the fight by unanimous decision.

Titles and accomplishments

Rajadamnern Stadium
 2022 Rajadamnern Stadium Welterweight (147 lbs) Champion
 2022 Rajadamnern World Series Welterweight (147 lbs) Winner

Muay Thai record

|-  style="background:#cfc;"
| 2023-03-04|| Win||align=left| Reza VenumMuayThai  || Rajadamnern World Series || Bangkok, Thailand || Decision (Unanimous)|| 3 ||3:00
|- style="background:#cfc" 
| 2022-12-16 || Win ||align="left" | Sibmuen Sitchefboontham || Rajadamnern World Series - Final || Bangkok, Thailand || Decision (Unanimous) || 5 || 3:00 
|-
! style=background:white colspan=9 |

|- style="background:#cfc" 
| 2022-11-04 || Win ||align="left" | Yodkhunpon Sitmonchai || Rajadamnern World Series - Semi Final || Bangkok, Thailand || Decision (Unanimous)|| 3||3:00

|- style="background:#c5d2ea" 
| 2022-09-30 || Draw ||align="left" | Sajad Sattari || Rajadamnern World Series - Group Stage  || Bangkok, Thailand || Decision (Majority) || 3 || 3:00

|- style="background:#cfc" 
| 2022-08-26 || Win ||align="left" | Mungkornkaw Sitkaewprapon || Rajadamnern World Series - Group Stage || Bangkok, Thailand || TKO (Doctor stoppage)|| 3||

|- style="background:#cfc" 
| 2022-07-22 || Win ||align="left" | Jonny Betts || Rajadamnern World Series - Group Stage || Bangkok, Thailand || Decision (Unanimous)|| 3||3:00

|-  style="background:#cfc"
| 2022-03-21 || Win||align=left| Julio Lobo || Singmawin, Rajadamnern Stadium || Bangkok, Thailand || Decision || 5 ||3:00
|-
! style=background:white colspan=9 |

|-  style="background:#fbb;"
| 2020-12-08|| Loss ||align=left| Kulabdam Sor.Jor.Piek-U-Thai || Lumpinee Birthday Show, Lumpinee Stadium || Bangkok, Thailand || KO (left hook) || 2 ||

|-  style="background:#cfc;"
| 2020-09-20|| Win ||align=left| Inseethong Por.Pinnapat || Kiatpetch,  Channel 7 Stadium || Bangkok, Thailand || TKO (Doctor stopapge)||  4||

|-  style="background:#cfc;"
| 2020-07-12|| Win ||align=left| Julio Lobo || Chang Muay Thai Kiatpetch, Or.Tor.Gor 3 Stadium || Nonthaburi Province, Thailand || Decision || 5 || 3:00

|-  style="background:#c5d2ea;"
| 2020-03-06|| Draw ||align=left| Julio Lobo ||  Kiatpetch, Lumpinee Stadium || Bangkok, Thailand ||Decision||  5||3:00

|-  style="background:#fbb;"
| 2020-02-09|| Loss ||align=left| Julio Lobo || Srithammaracha + Kiatpetch Super Fight || Nakhon Si Thammarat, Thailand ||Decision||  5|| 3:00

|-  style="background:#cfc;"
| 2019-11-24|| Win ||align=left| Darky Sawansangmanja ||  Kiatpetch, Channel 7 Stadium || Bangkok, Thailand || TKO (Low kicks)|| 2 ||

|-  style="background:#fbb;"
| 2019-09-13 || Loss ||align=left| Ferrari Jakrayanmuaythai ||  Samui Festival + Kiatpetch || Ko Samui, Thailand || Decision  || 5 || 3:00

|-  style="background:#fbb;"
| 2019-06-26|| Loss ||align=left| Kulabdam Sor.Jor.Piek-U-Thai || RuamponkonSamui + Kiatpetch Super Fight || Surat Thani, Thailand || Decision || 5 || 3:00

|-  style="background:#cfc;"
| 2019-05-10 || Win ||align=left| Ferrari Jakrayanmuaythai  || Kiatpetch, Lumpinee Stadium || Bangkok, Thailand || Decision || 5 || 3:00

|-  style="background:#cfc;"
| 2019-03-23 || Win ||align=left| Mahadej Or.Atchariya || Muay Thai Lumpinee SuperFight, Lumpinee Stadium || Bangkok, Thailand || KO (Right cross)|| 4 ||

|-  style="background:#cfc;"
| 2019-02-16 || Win ||align=left| Kaiyasit Kiatcharoenchai || Muay Thai Lumpinee SuperFight, Lumpinee Stadium || Bangkok, Thailand || Decision || 5 || 3:00

|-  style="background:#cfc;"
| 2019-01-19 || Win ||align=left| Jomhod Chor Ketweena || Muay Thai Lumpinee SuperFight, Lumpinee Stadium || Bangkok, Thailand || Decision || 5 || 3:00

|-  style="background:#fbb;"
| 2018-10-21|| Loss ||align=left| Bin Parunchai || Kiatpetch, Channel 7 Stadium || Bangkok, Thailand || KO (Elbow) || 2 ||

|-  style="background:#cfc;"
| 2018-09-15|| Win ||align=left| Detsaknoi Sor.SamarnGarden || || Thailand || Decision || 5 || 3:00

|-  style="background:#cfc;"
| 2018-06-30|| Win ||align=left| Revo Nakbinalaiyont || Kiatpetch, Lumpinee Stadium || Bangkok, Thailand || KO (Elbow) || 2 ||

|-
| colspan=9 | Legend:

References

Shadow Singmawynn
Living people
2000 births
Shadow Singmawynn